Ogrillon (pronounced ) may refer to:
a child ogre
Ogrillon (Dungeons & Dragons), a fictional creature in Dungeons & Dragons